The Big Horn Radio Network is an eight-station small market broadcasting company in northern Wyoming, and is one of three divisions of Legend Communications of Wyoming, LLC. It is based in Cody, Wyoming. The other divisions are Basin Radio Network in Gillette, Wyoming, and Big Horn Mountain Radio Network in Buffalo, Wyoming.

All three divisions are licensee divisions of Legend Communications of Wyoming, LLC, which owns and operates 15 radio broadcasting stations across Wyoming. The company is based at 1949 Mountain View Drive, Cody, Wyoming 82414  and 6805 Douglas Legum Drive, Suite 100, Elkridge, Maryland 20175. The corporate president is Dr. W. Lawrence Patrick, a radio industry professional for over 35 years, who holds Ph.D. in communications and management, as well as a law degree. The co-owner is Susan K. Patrick, M.B.A.

Big Horn Radio owns and operates in two different markets:

Cody

(Studios at 1949 Mountain View Drive, Cody)
 KZMQ AM 1140   "Good Time Oldies" (licensed to Greybull) 
 KODI AM 1400   "News and Talk 1400"
 KCWB (FM) 92.1 "The Cowboy"
 KTAG FM 97.9   "Today's Hits & Yesterdays Favorites"
 KZMQ-FM 100.3  "The Country Superstation" (licensed to Greybull)
 KCGL FM 104.1  "Classic Rock on the Eagle"

Worland

(Studios at 1340 Radio Drive, Worland)
 KWOR AM 1340   "News Talk Radio 1340"
 KKLX FM 96.1   "Hits of the 80's, 90's, and now"
 KVGL FM 105.7  "True Oldies"

External links
 Big Horn Radio Network official website

Companies based in Wyoming
American radio networks
Radio broadcasting companies of the United States